The Pfalz D.VII was a German biplane fighter aircraft from World War I. It was not put into production.

Design and development
The D.VII was a single-bay biplane with staggered, parallel-chord wings. It had simple parallel interplane struts; the upper centre section was supported on each side by a three-sided rectangular frame, open at the bottom where it was mounted on the upper fuselage.  There were externally connected ailerons on both upper and lower planes.

Behind the D.VII's rotary engine its fuselage was of rounded cross-section, with the single-seat, open cockpit just below the upper wing's trailing edge, where there was a small cut-out for better upward vision.  The horizontal tail was mounted at mid-fuselage; the fin was straight-edged and carried a full, rounded and horn balanced rudder.  The D.VII had a simple fixed conventional undercarriage, with mainwheels on a single axle supported at each end by a thin V-form pair of struts. There was a generous tailskid.  The D.VII had a pair of fixed LMG 08/15 machine guns, the standard German single-seat fighter armament of the time.

Beginning its flying programme near the end of 1917, the Pfalz was fitted with three types of rotary engines in testing: the  Oberursel U.III, the Goebel Goe.III and the Siemens-Halske Sh.III, the last two both producing .  These drove both two and four blade propellers.  Both balanced and unbalanced ailerons were tried.

The D.VII was one of three Pfalz aircraft which competed at the first D-Type contest held at Adlershof in January and February 1918, the others being the D.VI and the D.VIII. It gained its Type Certificate in February 1918 but did not receive a production order.

Specifications

References

Further reading

Biplanes
1910s German fighter aircraft
D.VII
Single-engined tractor aircraft
Rotary-engined aircraft
Aircraft first flown in 1917